Ludovico de Torres (4 November 1533 – 31 December 1583) was a Roman Catholic prelate who served as Archbishop of Monreale (1573–1583).

Biography
Ludovico de Torres was born in Málaga, Spain. On 9 December 1573, he was appointed during the papacy of Pope Gregory XIII as Archbishop of Monreale. On 31 December 1573, he was consecrated bishop by Marcantonio Maffei, Cardinal-Priest of San Callisto, with Prospero Rebiba, Titular Patriarch of Constantinople, and Giacomo Lomellino del Canto, Archbishop of Palermo, serving as co-consecrators. He served as Archbishop of Monreale until his death on 31 December 1583. He was succeeded by his nephew of the same name.

References 

16th-century Roman Catholic archbishops in Sicily
Bishops appointed by Pope Gregory XIII
1533 births
1583 deaths

it:Ludovico de Torres